Joaquín Lavega Colzada (born 3 February 2005) is a Uruguayan professional footballer who plays as a winger for River Plate Montevideo.

Club career
Lavega is a youth academy graduate of River Plate Montevideo. He made his professional debut for the club on 30 May 2021 in a goalless draw against Deportivo Maldonado.

In September 2022, he was named by English newspaper The Guardian as one of the best players born in 2005 worldwide.

International career
Lavega is a current Uruguayan youth national team player. He was part of Uruguay squad at 2019 South American U-15 Championship.

On 15 August 2021, Uruguay under-17 team coach Diego Demarco named Lavega in 20-man squad for 2021 U-18 L'Alcúdia International Football Tournament.

Career statistics

References

External links
 

2005 births
Living people
Footballers from Montevideo
Association football forwards
Uruguayan footballers
Uruguayan Primera División players
Club Atlético River Plate (Montevideo) players